The Nebraska National Guard consists of the:
Nebraska Army National Guard
Nebraska Air National Guard

See also
Nebraska State Guard

References

External links
Bibliography of Nebraska Army National Guard History compiled by the United States Army Center of Military History

National Guard (United States)
Military in Nebraska